Mokri is an Iranian-Kurdish surname. 

Notable people with the surname include:

 Amir Mokri, Iranian cinematographer
 Aziz Khan Mokri, Kurdish Military leader during the Qajar period in Iran.
 Mohammad Mokri, Iranian Kurdish scholar (Kurdologist)
 Mostafa Mokri, Iranian footballer
 Shahram Mokri, Iranian Kurdish writer

Iranian-language surnames